Florian Fabre (born 4 February 1987) is a French professional footballer who plays as a midfielder for Tours FC.

Club career
After years in the French lower divisions, Fabre joined Gazélec Ajaccio in January 2014, while the club was in the third division. He made his professional debut in a Ligue 2 victory over Valenciennes in August 2014.

Gazélec Ajaccio gained promotion to Ligue 1 at the end of the 2014–15 season. Fabre however moved on a free transfer to Nîmes Olympique in Ligue 2.

References

External links
 
 
 Florian Fabre foot-national.com Profile

1987 births
Living people
Footballers from Nîmes
Association football midfielders
French footballers
Ligue 2 players
Championnat National players
ES Uzès Pont du Gard players
Gazélec Ajaccio players
Nîmes Olympique players
FC Bastia-Borgo players
Tours FC players